A list of television series broadcast and produced in Puerto Rico:

Drama
En un dia
Color de Piel

Children
Atencion Atencion
Burbujita y Bolillo
Chicola y la ganga
Chiqui chef
El planeta de Remi
La casa de Maria Chuzema
Contra el reloj con Pacheco
El tio Nobel
Titi Chagua
A toda maquina
Sport Kids
Veloz Mente
Hi-5 Fiesta
Cine Recreo con Pacheco

Comedy
Ahí Va Eso
Al Aire Libre
A Reirse con Fab
A Reirse con Yoyo
Atencion Atencion
Cara o Cruz
Carmelo y Punto
Casos y Cosas de Casa
Con Lo Que Cuenta Este País
Cuqui
Desafiando a los Genios
Club sunshine
El Barrio Cuatro Calles
El Caso de la Mujer Asesinadita
El Colegio de la Alegria
El Condominio
El Cuartel de la Risa
El kiosco Budweiser
El gran Bejuco
El Profesor Colgate
El Show de Chanita
El Show de Raymond
En Casa de Juanma y Wiwi
En Familia
Entrando por la Cocina
Esto no es un Show
Esto no Tiene Nombre
Gaby, Fofó y Miliki
Genovevo (Puerto Rico TV show)
Ja ja, jiji, jo jo con Agrelot
La Camara Comica
La Criada
La Criada Malcriada
La Pareja Dispareja
La Pension de Dona Tere
La Taberna Budweiser
La Taberna India
Los Kakucómicos
Los García
Mapi y Papi
Maripili
No hay casa pa' tanta gente
Mimicas del Monte
Minga y Petraca
Mi familia
Mi Viejo y Yo
Que Angelitos
Que Vacilon
Sálvese quien Pueda
Simpli la Secretaria
Soltero y sin Compromiso
Soy Awilda
Sunshine's Cafe
Teatrimundo
Teatrilladas
Elena Santos
La casa del artista
TV Ilegal
TVO
Wilson Wilson
Raymond y sus Amigos

Musicals
Almorzando con Ruth Fernández
Aplausos: Hector Marcano
Borinquen Canta: Guillermo José Torres
Canta la Juventud: Alfred D. Herger, Lucecita Benítez & Chucho Avellanet
Concierto:  Cyd Marie Fleming & Hector Marcano
Contigo Anexo 3 (Lou Briel, Dagmar)
De Mujeres con Yolandita Monge
Del Brazo de Ruth Fernández
El Show de Carmita Jiménez
El Show de Charytín
El Show de Chucho Avellanet
El Show de Ednita Nazario
El Show de las 12:: Eddie Miró
El Show de Iris Chacón
El Show de Ivonne Coll
El Show de Judy Gordon
El show de Lissette
El Show de Nydia Caro
El Show de Olga y Tony
El Show de Tito Rodríguez
El Show Ford :: Tito Lara & Sonia Noemí
El Show Libby's Luis Vigoreaux
En Broma y en Serio :: Lou Briel & Dagmar
Entre Amigos con Edgardo Huertas
Estudio Alegre::  Juan Manuel Lebrón & Awilda Carbia
Flash con Alejandro Primero
Lo Mejor de la Semana::  Paquito Cordero
Luis Vigoreaux Presenta::  Lydia Echevarría & Luis Vigoreaux
Musicomedia::  Otilio Warrington, Dagmar, & Juan Manuel Lebrón
Música en Dos Tiempos::  Gilbert Mamery
Noche de Gala:::   Eddie Miró & Marisol Malaret
Noches de Café-Teatro::  Maria Falcon & Edgardo Huertas
Pentagrama
Nuestra Música tuvo varios animadores entre ellos, Jose Juan Tanon, Nydia Caro, Alejandro Primero, Lou Briel, Marisol Calero, Jose Miguel Class,(el gallito de Manati), Alwida la mimosa y Lunna. 
Rendezvous Nocturno::  Vilma Carbia
Señoras y Señores::  Beba Franco &  Chucho Avellanet
Showtime:: Wilkins,  Las Caribelles,  Henry Lafont &  El Casanova
Super Show Goya:: Lillian Hurst & Enrique Maluenda;;
Su Show Favorito:: Henry Lafont &  El Casanova
Voces en Función:: Lou Briel
Yo soy el Gallo::  José Miguel Class &  Awilda, La Mimosa
Tenderete

Cooking shows
Cielito Rosado en Mediodia P.R.
En la Cocina con Giovanna
Entrando Por la Cocina
Friendo y Comiendo (Luis Antonio Cosme & Bizcocho)
Henry Corona & Carmen Despradel
Pasteleria creativa
Por la Cocina con Luisito y Bizcocho (hosted by Luisito Vigoreaux and Bizcocho)
Operación Chef Piñeiro
La cocina de Giovani
Cocina Sano con Tony Newman

Educational
Abriendo Caminos
Contra Viento y Marea (hosted by Sandra Zaiter)
Cultura Viva hosted by Johanna Rosaly
Desde mi pueblo (hosted by YoYo Boing, Deborah Carthy Deu and Maria Falcon)
Nueva Economia

Game shows
Atrévete 
A Millón
Agujero En La Pared (Acted by Jeff Sutphen, Teck Holmes and Gilberto Valenzuela)
BrainSurge con Hoagie Numero 2
Control Remoto (based on MTV's Remote Control and removed after MTV threatened to sue)
Dale que Dale en Domingo
Dame un Break
El Tiempo es Oro con Mr. Cash
Fantástico
La Hora de Oro
Lo Tomas o lo Dejas
Pa 'rriba Papi pa ' rriba
Parejo, Doble y Triple
Sabado en Grande
Sube Nene, Sube!
Super Sabados
Ring ring gana!
El Resuelve
Y esto que es?
Gana con Ganas
Puerto Rico ¡Gana!

News
Las Noticias
Noticentro
Telenoticias
NotiSeis
En Vivo A Las Cinco
Telemundo en la Mañana
Tu Mañana

Events
Premios Kids Choice
Premios Hall Of Game

Fit
Moverlo movimiento

Reality shows
Janid: Atrediva
Objetivo Fama
La musa de Carlos Alberto
La casa de cristal
Idol Puerto Rico   
El show de jouventu 84 Puerto Rico
Kids Choice Sports (Acted by Yaire, Mariano Chiesa, Edgardo Huertas, Jacobo Morales and Kuki Sanban "Numero 3")

Virals
Acciones Mejores y Videos (Acted by Jeremy Shada)
Los Mejores Videos (Acted by Collin Dean)

Sports
Baloncesto Superior Nacional
Boxeo de Campeones
De Todo un Poco
Las Carreras
NWE Explosion
WWC Superestrellas de la Lucha Libre
IWA Impacto Total
IWA Zona Caliente

Talk shows
Levantate!
Aqui Estamos con Herman O' Neil y Shanira Blanco
Al Grano con Zervigon
Jovet, Controversial
El Show de Tommy
En Serio con Silverio
Escenario para la Vida
Ellas Al Mediodia
Lío
Mucho Gusto
Ojeda Sin Limite
A Calzón Quita'o
Ahora Podemos Hablar
Monica en confianza
Dimelo
Myrna, Chispi y la gente de hoy
Ruben Sanchez directo
Contigo
La batalla de los sexos
Jugando Pelota Dura

Variety
Pegate al Mediodia
Día a Día con Raymond y Dagmar
DavidSo El Show! (Acted by DavidSo)
Fenomenal con Hector Marcano
Levantate
El Super Show
El Show De Jojo Siwa (Acted by Jojo Siwa) 
Entre nosotras
Super Xclusivo
Anda pa'l cara
No te duermas
Pegate al mediodia
La Comay/ La condesa del bochinche
Buscados
Que suerte que es domingo
Lo se Todo

Teen drama
El Show de Los Chicos
Juventud 82 (and 83, 84 and so on)
La Hora de Menudo
Party Time
Teenager's Matinee
Canta la Juventud
Dos A-go-go
Discoteca Pepsi
Kaleidoscopio
La clase del 90
La Factoría Eléctrica
La Ola Nueva (con Millie Corretjer)
Zona Y
Punky Brewster 1980s

Spanish soap operas
Ahora O Nunca - Now or Never
Al Son Del Amor (Vendida en 34 países de América Europa y Asia) - To the beat of LoveAmor De Mad - Mother's LoveAnacaonaAnte la Ley - Before the Law- Figurative WandererArianaAventurera (Vendida en 17 países de América) - AdventurerBodas de Odio - Weddings of Hate  Cadenas de Amor - Chains of LoveConsciencia Culpable - Guilty ConscienceCoralito (Viewed in over 30 countries) -  Little CoralCristina Bazan (viewed in over 25 countries)Cuando los Hijos Condenan - When the Children CondemnDiana Carolina - Dianne CarolineDon amorDueña y Señora - Owner (possibly "Mistress") and Lady (title infers a sharp contrast) El Amor Nuestro de Cada Día - Our Love of Every DayEl Gran Amante - The Great LoverEl Hijo de Angela Maria -The Son of Angela MaryEl Idolo - The IdolEl Retrato de Angela - Angela's PortraitEn Aquella Playa (Transmitido en USA Vzla Col Ecu Perú Chile Arg Pan Mex PR y Esp) - At that BeachEscandalo (Viewed in over 15 countries) - ScandalJulieta - JulietKarina MontanerLa Isla - The IslandLa Jibarita - The peasant or country girlLa Sombra de Belinda - The Shadow of BelindaLa Verdadera Eva - The Real EveLaura Guzman, culpable - Laura Guzmán, GuiltyLos Dedos de la Mano - The Fingers on the HandLos Robles - The RobustsMillyModelos SA (Vendida en 15 países de América) - Models, South America Mujeres sin Hombre - Women without a manNatalia - NataliePoquita Cosa - Little ThingPosada Corazón - Love HearthPueblo Chico - Small TownRenzo, el gitano - Renzo, the GypsySecretos De Mujer - Woman's SecretsSeñora Tentacion (Vendida en 40 países de Latinoamérica U.S.A. Europa Asia y Países Arabes) - Lady TemptationTanairi (Viewed in over 35 countries, number one in Santa Esperanza - Holy HopeTomiko - Japanese nameTormento - RageTres Destinos (Vendida en 55 países de Latinoamérica U.S.A. Europa Asia y Países Arabes) - Three DestiniesUna Pasión En El Espejo - Passion in the mirrorVida - LifeViernes Social (Vendida en 17 países de América) - Social FridayVivir para Amar - Live to loveVivir Para Ti - Living for YouYo Sé Que Mentía'' - I know he was lying

References

Puerto Rico